Archibald Boyd (1890 – 29 September 1945) was a Scottish professional footballer who played as a goalkeeper in the Scottish League for Heart of Midlothian.

Personal life 
Boyd worked as a shale miner. His brother James was also a footballer for Heart of Midlothian and after the outbreak of the First World War in August 1914, the brothers were faced with the choice of which was to go to war. James made the decision to enlist, as Archie was engaged to be married. James was killed on the Somme while serving with McCrae's Battalion in August 1916.

Honours 
Heart of Midlothian

 East of Scotland Shield: 1914–15
 Dunedin Cup: 1914–15
 Wilson Cup: 1914–15

Career statistics

References 

Scottish footballers
1945 deaths
Scottish Football League players
Heart of Midlothian F.C. players
Footballers from West Lothian
Association football goalkeepers
Bo'ness F.C. players
1890 births
Scottish miners

Partick Thistle F.C. players
Scottish emigrants to Canada